The Salt River is a river  in the Western Cape province of South Africa. It is a confluence of the Black River which just previously has been confluenced by the Elsieskraal River, and the Liesbeeck River. It flows into Table Bay at the Salt River mouth. Its catchment is part of the Central Management Area of the City of Cape Town. In 1510 the area was the scene of the Battle of Salt River.

See also 
Salt River, Cape Town, the suburb in Cape Town 
Salt River railway station, a station in Salt River, Cape Town
Battle of Salt River
Salt River (Garden Route), a river mouthing near Nature's Valley
List of rivers of South Africa
List of estuaries of South Africa

References

External links
State of Rivers Report: Greater Cape Town River 2005

Rivers of the Western Cape

af:Soutrivier